Lesnica may refer to the following places:

Slovakia 

Lesnica (Slovakia), a village in Slovakia

Serbia 

Lesnica (Trgovište), Serbia

Poland 

Leśnica, a town in Opole Voivodeship (south-west Poland)
Leśnica, a district of Wrocław, Poland
Leśnica, Greater Poland Voivodeship (west-central Poland)
Leśnica, Tatra County in Lesser Poland Voivodeship (south Poland)
Leśnica, Wadowice County in Lesser Poland Voivodeship (south Poland)
Leśnica, Łódź Voivodeship (central Poland)
Leśnica, Podlaskie Voivodeship (north-east Poland)
Leśnica, Świętokrzyskie Voivodeship (south-central Poland)
Leśnica, Warmian-Masurian Voivodeship (north Poland)
Leśnica, West Pomeranian Voivodeship (north-west Poland)

See also
Lešnica (disambiguation)